Rachid Chihab (born 9 September 1961) is a Moroccan football manager who is currently managing Feignies Aulnoye FC.

Chihab was born in Morocco, and moved to France at the age of 12. He played football as an amateur, and quickly switched to coaching.

References

External links
  Rachid Chihab at ''footballdatabase.eu

1961 births
Living people
People from Mohammedia
Moroccan football managers
French football managers
French sportspeople of Moroccan descent
Expatriate football managers in Belgium